The Islamic Alliance to Support Egypt was an alliance of Islamist dissidents from the Muslim Brotherhood and al-Gama'a al-Islamiyya that would have run in the 2015 Egyptian parliamentary election. The different Islamist groups have different views on participation in the 2015 election.

Formerly affiliated groups
Free Front of the Islamic Group
Reform of the Islamic Group
Revolt of the Islamic Group
Brotherhood Dissidents
Brotherhood Without Violence

References

2015 establishments in Egypt
Defunct political party alliances in Egypt
Islamic political parties in Egypt